San Giuseppe delle Scalze a Pontecorvo is a church, located in Salita Pontecorvo, in the historical center of Naples, Italy.

The church was built in 1619 in the site where the Palazzo Spinelli a Pontecorvo stood, and was rebuilt in 1643 and 1660 by Cosimo Fanzago. Decoration in the exterior and interior were added in 1709 by  Giovanni Battista Manni. The church first was linked to Tersian monks, and then to Barnabite priests. The earthquake of 1980 brought down the frescoed ceiling, and failure to protect the fragments led to their degradation, as well as the interior. Vandalism further despoiled the interior or marble and balustrades. The building has not been reconstructed or deconsecrated. 

The interior has a Greek cross plan with four corner chapels. Much of the interior artwork has been removed, including a St Joseph and Young Jesus (1660) by Luca Giordano, and now in the Museo di Capodimonte. A Calvary and a St Teresa and St Peter of Alcantara by Francesco di Maria are now kept in the Museum of San Martino.

Bibliography
Antonio Terraciano, Andrea Russo, Le chiese di Napoli. Censimento e brevi recensioni delle 448 chiese storiche della città di Napoli, Lorenzo Giunta Editor, 1999.

External links

Il degrado of the church di San Giuseppe delle Scalze a Pontecorvo, article in Agenzia Radicale

Churches in Naples
17th-century Roman Catholic church buildings in Italy
Baroque architecture in Naples
Roman Catholic churches completed in 1660
1660 establishments in Italy